B. Subbayya Shetty is an Indian politician who has been a Minister in the Government of Karnataka. He is also the President of the Karnataka State unit of the Janata Party. He was member of legislative assembly( M.L.A) of Surathkal constituency in Fifth ( (24 March 1972 – 31 December 1977) and Sixth (17 March 1978 – 8 June 1983 )Karnataka legislative assembly. He was formerly a member of the Indo-Tibetan Border Police force, and president of the Forum for National Integration.

See
N. M. Adyanthaya

References

State cabinet ministers of Karnataka
People from Dakshina Kannada district
Living people
Janata Party politicians
Year of birth missing (living people)
Mysore MLAs 1972–1977
Karnataka MLAs 1978–1983